Bar None may refer to:
Bar None, a discontinued chocolate bar formerly distributed by The Hershey Company
BarNone, a company that connects consumers seeking auto loans with car dealerships
Bar None (nightclub), a chain of bar/nightclubs that originated from New York City
Bar/None Records, an independent record label based in New Jersey.
Bar None Dude Ranch, the fictional setting for the Nickelodeon series Hey Dude
William Floyd, former NFL player, nicknamed Bar None